Gramella sediminilitoris is a Gram-negative, aerobic, non-spore-forming and motile bacterium from the genus of Gramella which has been isolated from tidal flat from Goheung in Korea.

References

Flavobacteria
Bacteria described in 2016